Working with the Hands by Booker T. Washington is described by its author as a sequel to his classic Up From Slavery.

The full title of the work is Working with the hands; being a sequel to "Up From Slavery," covering the author's experiences in industrial training at Tuskegee

See also
 List of books written by Booker T. Washington

Links
Archive.org scan of Working with the Hands

1904 non-fiction books
African-American autobiographies
Books by Booker T. Washington
20th-century history books